Alkalibacterium gilvum is a Gram-positive, non-spore-forming, halophilic, alkaliphilic and non-motile bacterium from the genus Alkalibacterium which has been isolated from cheeses from Europe.

References

Lactobacillales
Bacteria described in 2013